Vestra may refer to the following:

Vestra, a village in Vindafjord, Norway
Vestra, a tradename of reboxetine
Vestra, a district of Vantaa, Finland
 one of the outposts in the fictional universe of the game Fury3
 Vestra, a Latin word meaning "your" (possessive)